The following is a select list of Calgary Stampeders all-time records and statistics current to the 2022 CFL season. Each category lists the top five players, where known, except for when the fifth place player is tied in which case all players with the same number are listed.

Service 

Most Games Played
276 – Mark McLoughlin (1988–2003)
224 – Larry Robinson (1961–74)
223 – Jay McNeil (1994–2007)
216 – Jamie Crysdale (1993–2005)
214 – Alondra Johnson (1991–2003)

Most Seasons Played
16 – Mark McLoughlin (1988–2003)
14 – Larry Robinson (1961–74)
14 – Jay McNeil (1994–2007)
13 – Stu Laird (1984–96)
13 – Alondra Johnson (1991–2003)
13 – Jamie Crysdale (1993–2005)

Scoring 

Most points – Career
2957 – Mark McLoughlin (1988–2003)
1944 – Rene Paredes (2011–19, 2021–22)
1275 – J.T. Hay (1979–88)
1030 – Larry Robinson (1961–75)
930 – Sandro DeAngelis (2005–09)

Most Points – Season
220 – Mark McLoughlin (1995)
220 – Mark McLoughlin (1996)
217 – Sandro DeAngelis (2008)
215 – Mark McLoughlin (1993)
214 – Sandro DeAngelis (2006)

Most Points – Game
30 – Earl Lunsford – versus Edmonton Eskimos, September 3, 1962
26 – Mark McLoughlin – versus Saskatchewan Roughriders, August 5, 1996
24 – Gene Filipski – at BC Lions, November 5, 1961
24 – Herm Harrison – at Winnipeg Blue Bombers, September 2, 1970
24 – Jon Cornish – versus Saskatchewan Roughriders, August 9, 2013
24 – Romar Morris – versus Edmonton Eskimos, September 8, 2018
24 – Reggie Begelton – versus Montreal Alouettes, August 17, 2019
24 – Tommy Stevens – versus Edmonton Eskimos, September 10, 2022

Most Touchdowns – Career
117 – Allen Pitts (1990–2000)
76 – Kelvin Anderson (1996–2002)
67 – Nik Lewis (2004–14)
62 – Tom Forzani (1973–83)
61 – Joffrey Reynolds (2004–11)

Most Touchdowns – Season
21 – Allen Pitts (1994)
19 – Tony Stewart (1994)
17 – Terry Evanshen (1967)
16 – Kelvin Anderson (1998)
15 – eight times, most recently Romby Bryant (2010)

Most Touchdowns – Game
5 – Earl Lunsford – versus Edmonton Eskimos, September 3, 1962
4 – Gene Filipski – at BC Lions, November 5, 1961
4 – Herm Harrison – at Winnipeg Blue Bombers, September 2, 1970
4 – Jon Cornish – versus Saskatchewan Roughriders, August 9, 2013
4 – Romar Morris – versus Edmonton Eskimos, September 8, 2018
4 – Reggie Begelton – versus Montreal Alouettes, August 17, 2019
4 – Tommy Stevens – versus Edmonton Eskimos, September 10, 2022

Most Rushing Touchdowns – Career
55 – Earl Lunsford (1956, 1959–63)
53 – Joffrey Reynolds (2004–11)
52 – Kelvin Anderson (1996–2002)
45 – James Sykes (1978–83)
44 – Jon Cornish (2007–15)

Most Rushing Touchdowns – Season
14 – Tony Stewart (1994)
13 – Earl Lunsford (1960)
13 – Lovell Coleman (1963)
13 – James Sykes (1978)
12 – Jon Cornish (2013)

Most Rushing Touchdowns – Game
5 – Earl Lunsford – versus Edmonton Eskimos, September 3, 1962
4 – Jon Cornish – versus Saskatchewan Roughriders, August 9, 2013
4 – Tommy Stevens – versus Edmonton Eskimos, September 10, 2022
3 – 17 times, most recently Jerome Messam – versus Hamilton Tiger-Cats, July 29, 2017

Most Receiving Touchdowns – Career
117 – Allen Pitts (1990–2000)
65 – Nik Lewis (2004–14)
62 – Tom Forzani (1973–83)
57 – Travis Moore (1994, 1996–2002)
50 – Willie Armstead (1976–82)

Most Receiving Touchdowns – Season
21 – Allen Pitts (1994)
17 – Terry Evanshen (1967)
15 – Allen Pitts (1991)
15 – Dave Sapunjis (1993)
15 – Travis Moore (2000)
15 – Romby Bryant (2010)

Most Receiving Touchdowns – Game
4 – Herm Harrison – at Winnipeg Blue Bombers, September 2, 1970
4 – Reggie Begelton – versus Montreal Alouettes, August 17, 2019
3 – 12 times, most recently Maurice Price – versus Edmonton Eskimos, September 2, 2013

Passing 

Most Passing Yards – Career
32,541 – Bo Levi Mitchell (2012–2019, 2021–22)
32,191 – Henry Burris (1998–99, 2005–11)
20,551 – Doug Flutie (1992–95)
16,741 – Peter Liske (1966–68, 1973–74) 
16,449 – Jeff Garcia (1994–98)

Most Passing Yards – Season
6092 – Doug Flutie (1993)
5945 – Doug Flutie (1992)
5726 – Doug Flutie (1994)
5385 – Bo Levi Mitchell (2016)
5124 – Bo Levi Mitchell (2018)

Most Passing Yards – Game
556 – Doug Flutie – at Ottawa Rough Riders, August 6, 1993
553 – Peter Liske – versus Saskatchewan Roughriders, September 29, 1968
547 – Doug Flutie – at Saskatchewan Roughriders, October 23, 1993
546 – Jeff Garcia – versus Edmonton Eskimos, September 4, 1995
487 – Doug Flutie – at Saskatchewan Roughriders, July 7, 1992

Most Pass Completions – Career
2496 – Bo Levi Mitchell (2012–19, 2021–22)
2267 – Henry Burris (1998–99, 2005–11)
1438 – Doug Flutie (1992–95)
1250 – Jeff Garcia (1994–98)
1145 – Peter Liske (1966–68, 1973–74) 

Most Pass Completions – Season
416 – Doug Flutie (1993)
412 – Bo Levi Mitchell (2016)
403 – Doug Flutie (1994)
396 – Doug Flutie (1992)
381 – Henry Burris (2008)

Most Pass Completions – Game
37 – Doug Flutie – at Saskatchewan Roughriders, October 23, 1993
34 – Ken Johnson – at BC Lions, August 29, 1981
34 – Doug Flutie – versus Toronto Argonauts, July 28, 1993
34 – Marcus Crandell – at Edmonton Eskimos, September 10, 2004
34 – Bo Levi Mitchell – at Montreal Alouettes, July 14, 2017

Most Passing Touchdowns – Career
203 – Henry Burris (1998–99, 2005–11)
188 – Bo Levi Mitchell (2012–19, 2021–22)
140 – Doug Flutie (1992–95)
111 – Peter Liske (1966–68, 1973–74) 
106 – Jeff Garcia (1994–98)

Most Passing Touchdowns – Season
48 – Doug Flutie (1994)
44 – Doug Flutie (1993)
40 – Peter Liske (1967)
39 – Henry Burris (2008)
38 – Henry Burris (2010)

Most Passing Touchdowns – Game
6 – Peter Liske – versus Winnipeg Blue Bombers, October 15, 1967
6 – Doug Flutie – versus Winnipeg Blue Bombers, July 23, 1994
6 – Jeff Garcia – versus Edmonton Eskimos, September 4, 1995
6 – Dave Dickenson – at Saskatchewan Roughriders, July 28, 2000
5 – eight times, most recently Henry Burris – versus Winnipeg Blue Bombers, October 18, 2008

Best Completion Percentage – Career (minimum 100 attempts)
72.6 – Nick Arbuckle (2018–19)
71.1 – Jake Maier (2021–22)
66.7 – Kevin Glenn (2012–13)
66.4 – Drew Tate (2009–16)
65.1 – Dave Dickenson (1997–2000, 2008)

Best Completion Percentage – Season (minimum 100 attempts)
74.7 – Jake Maier (2022)
73.1 – Nick Arbuckle (2019)
68.0 – Bo Levi Mitchell (2016)
67.1 – Doug Flutie (1995)
66.7 – Kevin Glenn (2012)

Best Completion Percentage – Game (minimum 20 attempts)
90.9 – Bo Levi Mitchell – (20/22) – at Toronto Argonauts, June 23, 2018
87.9 – Bo Levi Mitchell – (29/33) – at Winnipeg Blue Bombers, July 26, 2013
86.4 – Nick Arbuckle – (19/22) – at Saskatchewan Roughriders, July 6, 2019
85.0 – Mike McCoy – (17/20) – at Toronto Argonauts, October 9, 1999
84.0 – Henry Burris – (21/25) – versus Winnipeg Blue Bombers, October 30, 2005

Rushing 

Most Rushing Yards – Career
9213 – Joffrey Reynolds (2004–11)
8292 – Kelvin Anderson (1996–2002)
6994 – Earl Lunsford (1956, 1959–63)
6844 – Jon Cornish (2007–15)
6395 – Lovell Coleman (1960–67)

Most Rushing Yards – Season
1896 – Willie Burden (1975)
1813 – Jon Cornish (2012)
1794 – Earl Lunsford (1961)
1629 – Lovell Coleman (1964)
1541 – Joffrey Reynolds (2006)
1509 – Lovell Coleman – 1965
1504 - Joffrey Reynolds – 2009
1457 - Jon Cornish – 2012
1453 - Joffrey Reynolds – 2005
1383 - Kelvin Anderson – 2001
1343 - Earl Lunsford – 1960
1343 - Lovell Coleman – 1963
1325 - Kelvin Anderson – 1998
1310 - Joffrey Reynolds – 2008
1306 - Kelvin Anderson – 1999
1283 - Earl Lunsford – 1956
1263 - James Sykes – 1980
1231 - Joffrey Reynolds – 2007
1200 - Joffrey Reynolds – 2010
1198 - Jerome Messam – 2016
1153 - Gary Allen – 1986
1135 - Hugh McKinnis – 1970
1120 - Tony Stewart – 1994
1107 - James Sykes – 1981
1088 - Kelvin Anderson – 1997
1088 - Ka'Deem Carey – 2022
1082 - Jon Cornish – 2014
1074 - Kelvin Anderson – 2002
1068 - Kelvin Anderson – 1996
1048 - Kelvin Anderson – 2000
1046 - James Sykes – 1982
1043 - Howard Waugh – 1954
1032 - Willie Burden – 1977
1027 - Earl Lunsford – 1959
1020 - James Sykes – 1978
1016 - Earl Lunsford – 1962
1016 - Jerome Messam – 2017

Most Rushing Yards – Game
238 – Lovell Coleman – at Hamilton Tiger-Cats, September 15, 1964
238 – Willie Burden – versus Winnipeg Blue Bombers, November 2, 1975
224 – Lovell Coleman – versus Edmonton Eskimos, August 18, 1965
211 – Earl Lunsford – versus Edmonton Eskimos, September 5, 1960
209 – Earl Lunsford – versus BC Lions, November 5, 1961

Most Rushing Attempts – Career
1670 – Kelvin Anderson (1996–2002)
1590 – Joffrey Reynolds (2004–11)
1242 – Willie Burden (1974–81)
1199 – Earl Lunsford (1956, 1959–63)
1084 – Lovell Coleman (1960–67)

Most Rushing Attempts – Season 
332 – Willie Burden (1975)
296 – Earl Lunsford (1961)
262 – Kelvin Anderson (1999)
262 – Kelvin Anderson (2000)
260 – Lovell Coleman (1964)

Most Rushing Attempts – Game
36 – Lovell Coleman – at Winnipeg Blue Bombers, August 12, 1963
34 – Willie Burden – versus Winnipeg Blue Bombers, November 2, 1975
31 – Earl Lunsford – versus BC Lions, November 5, 1961
29 – Joffrey Reynolds – versus Ottawa Renegades, September 22, 2005
29 – Kelvin Anderson – versus Edmonton Eskimos, October 25, 1998

Most 1000-yard seasons – Career
7 – Kelvin Anderson (1996–2002)
6 – Joffrey Reynolds (2005–11)
5 – Earl Lunsford (1956, 1959–63)
4 – James Sykes (1978–83)
3 – Lovell Coleman (1960–67)
3 – Jon Cornish (2007–15)

Receiving 

Most Receiving Yards – Career
14,891 – Allen Pitts (1990–2000)
11,250 – Nik Lewis (2004–14)
8285 – Tom Forzani (1973–83)
7536 – Travis Moore (1996–2002)
6693 – Herm Harrison (1964–72)

Most Receiving Yards – Season
2036 – Allen Pitts (1994)
1764 – Allen Pitts (1991)
1662 – Terry Evanshen (1967)
1655 – Dave Sapunjis (1995)
1591 – Allen Pitts (1992)

Most Receiving Yards – Game
249 – Kamar Jorden – versus Winnipeg Blue Bombers, August 25, 2018
237 – Herm Harrison – versus Saskatchewan Roughriders, September 29, 1968
230 – Brian Wiggins – at Saskatchewan Roughriders, October 23, 1993
216 – Bob Shaw – at Edmonton Eskimos, October 11, 1952
211 – Romby Bryant – versus Edmonton Eskimos, October 23, 2009

Most Receptions – Career
966 – Allen Pitts (1990–2000)
805 – Nik Lewis (2004–14)
553 – Tom Forzani (1973–83)
470 – Travis Moore (1996–2002)
468 – Vince Danielsen (1994–2001)

Most Receptions – Season
126 – Allen Pitts (1994)
118 – Allen Pitts (1991)
111 – Dave Sapunjis (1995)
103 – Allen Pitts (1992)
103 – Dave Sapunjis (1993)

Most Receptions – Game
16 – Brian Wiggins – at Saskatchewan Roughriders, October 23, 1993
14 – Mike Levenseller – versus Saskatchewan Roughriders, August 19, 1984
13 – Chuck Holloway – versus Saskatchewan Roughriders, September 15, 1958
13 – Dave Sapunjis – at Birmingham Barracudas, August 26, 1995
12 – seven times, most recently Kamar Jorden – at Edmonton Elks, September 11, 2021

Most Consecutive Games with a Reception
166 – Nik Lewis – (2004–14)
85 – Allen Pitts – (1990–95)
82 – Allen Pitts – (1996–2000)
81 – Ken-Yon Rambo – (2006–11)
78 – Marquay McDaniel – (2012–17)

Interceptions 

Most Interceptions – Career
50 – Larry Robinson (1961–75)
35 – Harvey Wylie (1956–64)
34 – Terry Irvin (1977–93, 1985)
30 – Frank Andruski (1966–73)
28 – Wayne Harris (1961–72)
28 – Jerry Keeling (1978–83)

Most Interceptions – Season
10 – Harvey Wylie (1959)
10 – Vernon Roberson (1975)
10 – Rich Robinson (1994)
10 – Greg Knox (1994)
9 – Rae Ross (1958)
9 – Larry Robinson (1963)
9 – Al Burleson (1979)

Most Interceptions – Game
3 – many players, most recently Tre Roberson – versus Ottawa Redblacks, June 15, 2019

Most Interception Return Yards – Career
756 – Keon Raymond (2008–15)
717 – Larry Robinson (1961–75)
676 – Frank Andruski (1966–73)
563 – Darrell Moir (1979–85)
526 – Ray Odums (1977–84)

Most Interception Return Yards – Season
246 – Dwight Anderson (2010)
237 – Keon Raymond (2011)
204 – Frank Andruski (1973)
203 – Keon Raymond (2014)
202 – Darryl Hall (1992)

Most Interception Return Yards – Game
138 – Jackie Kellogg – versus Hamilton Tiger-Cats, September 16, 2000
131 – William Fields – at Edmonton Eskimos, September 7, 2001
117 – Keon Raymond – at Saskatchewan Roughriders, August 12, 2011
115 – Karl Anthony – versus Saskatchewan Roughriders, October 10, 1993
113 – Nate Terry – at Edmonton Eskimos, September 9, 2005

Tackles 
 Note: Tackles were first recorded in 1987, but there was no differentiation between Defensive and Special Teams tackles. Those categorical differences were added in 1991.

Most Defensive Tackles – Career
916 – Alondra Johnson (1991–2003)
644 – Brandon Smith (2008–19)
531 – Matt Finlay (1987–95)
530 – Richie Hall (1983–87)
438 – Jamar Wall (2012–19, 2021)

Most Defensive Tackles – Season
123 – Alex Singleton (2017)
123 – Alex Singleton (2018)
122 – Doug Landry (1989)
116 – George White (2005)
99 – Bernie Morrison (1987)

Most Defensive Tackles – Game
13 – Greg Peterson – at Winnipeg Blue Bombers, September 13, 1987
13 – Alex Singleton – versus Edmonton Eskimos, September 4, 2017
12 – George White – versus Hamilton Tiger-Cats, October 14, 2005 
12 – Cory Greenwood – at Winnipeg Blue Bombers, August 8, 2019
12 – Darnell Sankey – at Hamilton Tiger-Cats, September 17, 2021
12 – Darnell Sankey – at BC Lions, November 12, 2021

Most Special Teams Tackles – Career
158 – Raymond Biggs (1993–2000)
139 – Aldi Henry (1997–2002)
105 – Greg Frers (1993–95, 1998–2002)
96 – Roger Reinson (1994–99)
93 – Karl McCartney (2010–15)

Most Special Teams Tackles – Season
35 – Aldi Henry (2001)
33 – Dave Sapunjis (1991)
31 – Raymond Biggs (1996)
27 – Paul Clatney (1991)
27 – Roger Reinson (1997)

Most Special Teams Tackles – Game
7 – Paul Clatney – versus BC Lions, July 11, 1991

Quarterback sacks 
 Note: Sacks were first recorded in 1981.

Most Sacks – Career
99 – Will Johnson (1989–96)
99 – Charleston Hughes (2008–17)
72 – Stu Laird (1984–96)
43 – Alondra Johnson (1991–2003)
41 – Micah Johnson (2013–18)

Most Sacks – Season
19 – Harold Hallman (1986)
18 – Charleston Hughes (2013)
17 – Will Johnson (1994)
16 – Will Johnson (1990)
16 – Kent Warnock (1990)
16 – Charleston Hughes (2016)

Most Sacks – Game
4 – Harold Hallman – versus Edmonton Eskimos, June 24, 1986
4 – Stu Laird – versus Edmonton Eskimos, June 24, 1986
4 – Alvis Satele – versus Toronto Argonauts, October 13, 1986
4 – Will Johnson – versus Las Vegas Posse, October 2, 1994
4 – Anwar Stewart – versus BC Lions, October 26, 2012

Field goals 
Most Field Goals – Career
664 – Mark McLoughlin (1988–2003)
494 – Rene Paredes (2011–19, 2021–22)
282 – J.T. Hay (1979–88)
218 – Sandro DeAngelis (2005–09)
171 – Larry Robinson (1961–75)

Most Field Goals – Season
56 – Sandro DeAngelis (2006)
56 – Rene Paredes (2016)
54 – Mark McLoughlin (1996)
54 – Rene Paredes (2013)
54 – Rene Paredes (2022)

Most Field Goals – Game
8 – Mark McLoughlin – versus Saskatchewan Roughriders, August 5, 1996
6 – ten times, most recently, Rene Paredes – versus BC Lions, October 16, 2021

Highest Field Goal Accuracy – Career (minimum 100 attempts)
87.6% – Rene Paredes (2011–19, 2021–22)
83.8% – Sandro DeAngelis (2005–09)
73.7% – Mark McLoughlin (1988–2003)
70.1% – J.T. Hay (1979–88)
60.9% – Cyril McFall (1974–78)

Highest Field Goal Accuracy – Season (minimum 30 attempts)
94.74% – Rene Paredes (2013)
93.02% – Rene Paredes (2012)
91.67% – Rene Paredes (2021)
91.38% – Rene Paredes (2017)
91.11% – Rene Paredes (2018)

Longest Field Goal
58 yards – Mark McLoughlin – at Saskatchewan Roughriders, October 9, 1988
57 yards – J. T. Hay – versus Ottawa Rough Riders, September 14, 1984

Most Consecutive Field Goals
39 – Rene Paredes (2012–13)
32 – Rene Paredes (2016)
30 – Rene Paredes (2021–22)
21 – Rene Paredes (2015)

References 
Calgary Stampeders 2019 Media Guide
Labour Day Classic 2017 Game Notes
CFL website

Calgary Stampeders lists
Canadian Football League records and statistics